Oz is the fourth studio album by Australian singer-songwriter Missy Higgins, and was released by Eleven on 19 September 2014. It is Higgins' first cover album, which is accompanied by a book of the same name that collects a series of essays by Higgins; using each song title as a jumping off point. The album's title refers to each of the artists covered being from Australia, as well as being a reference to the land of Oz as established in The Wizard of Oz.

Upon release, Higgins said “I wanted to try something different this time around. I couldn’t decide between making a covers album or writing a book so I decided to do both at once. Musically it’s intended to be a real mixed bag of lollies.” adding “I like the idea of songwriters being like the Wizard in The Wizard of Oz. Some people think we're special people who have special powers but really we're just scared little people hiding in a backroom somewhere, working like crazy to make sure we don't get found out.”

The album was originally conceived by Higgins and her manager, John Watson, as a circuit-breaker during the several years of depression and writer's block that preceded the singer's third album, The Ol' Razzle Dazzle in 2012. Higgins successfully persisted with writing her own material, but came back to the idea of interpreting some of her favourite Australian songs in 2013.

The album's lead single is "Shark Fin Blues", originally released by The Drones on their 2005 album Wait Long by the River.... It was released via SoundCloud on 7 July 2014. A music video for the song was released on 11 August 2014.

Critical reception

Everett True from The Guardian said: "Having Missy Higgins cover a series of widely disparate songs in her trademark style leads to an unintentional levelling off, a flattening of variety. Whether this is to the album's detriment will come down to how much you like Missy Higgins."

Carley Hill from The Music said: "Higgins has made these much-loved tracks sing with a bold, new voice", adding, "Higgins' lush symphonic rendering of The Drones' guttural "Shark Fin Blues" is arguably the best on the album."

Helena Ho from Renowned for Sound said: Higgins transformed "each track based on her own musical style, so that it is worthy to be critiqued as a new song altogether." adding "Oz is a tribute to some of the country’s greatest music artists."

Ali Birnie from Beat Magazine said: "Higgins has made these songs shine with her unique and beautiful style."

Track listing

Charts

Weekly charts

Year-end charts

References

2014 albums
Missy Higgins albums
Eleven: A Music Company albums